The rufous-headed parrotbill (Psittiparus bakeri), or greater rufous-headed parrotbill, is a parrotbill in the family Paradoxornithidae and is found in eastern Asia from the eastern Himalayas to Indochina.

Taxonomy and systematics
The rufous-headed parrotbill was alternatively considered as a member of the Old World babblers family,  Timaliidae, or in the Sylviidae, but it actually seems to belong to the distinct family Paradoxornithidae. It was formerly considered as conspecific with the white-breasted parrotbill.

Distribution and habitat
The natural habitats of the rufous-headed parrotbill are subtropical or tropical moist lowland forests and subtropical or tropical moist montane forests.

References

Robson, C. (2007). Family Paradoxornithidae (Parrotbills) pp. 292 – 321   in; del Hoyo, J., Elliott, A. & Christie, D.A. eds. Handbook of the Birds of the World, Vol. 12. Picathartes to Tits and Chickadees. Lynx Edicions, Barcelona.

rufous-headed parrotbill
Birds of Eastern Himalaya
Birds of Laos
Birds of Myanmar
Birds of Vietnam
rufous-headed parrotbill
Taxonomy articles created by Polbot